"Calloused Hands" is a song written by Pat Alger and Gene Levine, and recorded by American country music artist Mark Collie.  It was released in June 1991 as the first single from the album Born and Raised in Black & White.  The song reached #31 on the Billboard Hot Country Singles & Tracks chart.

Chart performance

References

1991 singles
1991 songs
Mark Collie songs
Songs written by Pat Alger
Song recordings produced by Tony Brown (record producer)
Song recordings produced by Doug Johnson (record producer)
MCA Records singles